The list of shipwrecks in June 1830 includes ships sunk, foundered, grounded, or otherwise lost during June 1830.

3 June

4 June

5 June

8 June

11 June

22 June

25 June

28 June

29 June

Unknown date

References

1830-06